Zülegt ( Lawn, also Zulegt, Dzulegt) is an urban-type settlement in Ikhkhet sum (district) of Dornogovi Province in south-eastern Mongolia. Zülegt is the Ikhkhet sum centre.

In Zülegt is the fluorspar open pit mine.

References 

Mining communities in Mongolia